Robert Dundas may refer to:
 Robert Dundas (died 1726), Scottish judge and politician
 Robert Dundas of Arniston, the Elder (1685–1753), his son, Scottish judge
 Robert Dundas of Arniston, the younger (1713–1787), Scottish judge
 Robert Dundas of Arniston (1758–1819), Scottish judge
 Sir Robert Dundas, 1st Baronet (1761–1835), Scottish landowner and lawyer
 Robert Dundas, 2nd Viscount Melville (1771–1851), Scottish nobleman
 Robert Dundas, 4th Viscount Melville, Scottish nobleman
 Robert Nisbet-Hamilton, born Robert Dundas
Sir Robert Lawrence Dundas (1780–1844), British Army officer and politician